The 1983 German Supercup was an unofficial edition of the German Supercup, a football match contested by the winners of the previous season's Bundesliga and DFB-Pokal competitions.

The match was played at the Olympiastadion in Munich, and contested by cup winners Bayern Munich and league champions Hamburger SV. Bayern won the match 4–2 on penalties, following a 1–1 draw (with no extra time played), to claim the unofficial title.

Teams

Match

Details

See also
 1981–82 Bundesliga
 1981–82 DFB-Pokal

References

Unofficial 1983
FC Bayern Munich matches
Hamburger SV matches
1982–83 in German football cups
DFB-Supercup 1983